Brunch was a New Zealand morning television program. It aired on ChoiceTV. It was hosted by April Ieremia and Josh Kronfeld. It was filmed in the Avalon Studios in Wellington NZ. The program finished its only season for 2012 on 21 December 2012; it was announced on the ChoiceTV Facebook page by a viewer that the program was not getting renewed for a 2013 season.

Background
This show covered a lot of general audience and is targeted at an older generation. The show included home renovation, entertainment, music, and do-it-yourself segments.

References

2010s New Zealand television series
2012 New Zealand television series debuts
2012 New Zealand television series endings
Breakfast television in New Zealand
New Zealand television news shows
New Zealand television talk shows